State Route 118 (SR 118) is a southwest-northeast state highway in the southwest part of the U.S. state of Georgia. The highway runs  from Dawson, northeast through Smithville, to Leslie. Between Dawson and Smithville, the route parallels the Georgia Southwestern Railroad.

Route description
SR 118 begins at an intersection with SR 32 in Dawson. The route heads northeast, and crosses Kinchafoonee Creek before intersecting US 19/SR 3 in Smithville. East of Smithville, the route crosses Muckalee Creek before intersecting SR 377. It continues to the northeast to Leslie. In Leslie, the route has a brief (about ) concurrency with SR 195. At its eastern terminus, an intersection with US 280/SR 30, SR 195 heads east with US 280/SR 30.

History

Major intersections

See also

References

External links

118
Transportation in Terrell County, Georgia
Transportation in Lee County, Georgia
Transportation in Sumter County, Georgia